Liffey Valley Shopping Centre is a shopping centre located in Dublin 22, Ireland which Comprises 80 stores and 20 Restaurants. The centre was a scaled-down replacement for a much larger complex once mooted for the site, known as Quarryvale, the development of which was highly controversial. After over a decade without major development, the centre was extended in 2016.

Tenants
Anchor tenants at the centre are Ireland's largest Marks & Spencer, Dunnes Stores, Next, and Ireland's largest Boots. In 2010 large H&M and New Look fashions stores opened in the centre of the mall. The centre is home to Vue Dublin cinemas (formerly Ster Century Dublin). One of the anchor tenants at the time of opening was Ireland's only branch of C&A, which closed when the parent firm exited the UK market. This unit was taken by Dunnes Stores.

An associated retail park, The Retail Park, Liffey Valley, is nearby, with several warehouse-style stores.

Renovations

In February 2015, Liffey Valley announced that it was to begin a €26 million expansion of the shopping centre. The expansion had brought six new restaurants to the shopping centre including Prezzo and TGI Fridays. As well as expanding the Vue cinema and building a new Penneys which opened on 6 December 2016. Tesco opened in the summer of 2018. and was expected to create 450 new jobs.

The construction of the Penneys Store marked the first new store opening in a decade, leading the branch at Liffey Valley to be more modernized, incorporating an Insomnia cafe within the confines of the shop. The general extensions at Liffey Valley attracted significant media interest, and have rejuvenated the local economy. Further extensions were refused planning permission by An Bord Pleanala as they would be detrimental to traffic congestion.

In April 2020 property group Hines submitted a €135 million plan for a major extension to the Liffey Valley Centre in Dublin.  The mixed leisure, entertainment and retail extension will include a large public plaza, and creating a new east-west street at the centre. There will also be two large retail units on either side of the plaza.

A new TK Maxx has been built beside the new entrance beside Penneys and opened in 2021.

Transport
Liffey Valley is served by Dublin Bus and Go-Ahead Ireland routes C1, C2, C3, C4, C5, C6, P29, L51, L53, X25, X26, X27, X28, X30, X31, X32, 26, G2, 76 and 76a.

On the 19th of February 2023, a brand new 'Bus Plaza' opened serving routes G2, 26, 76, 76a, L51 and L53. It is located 100 feet from the front entrance of the shopping centre and is part of the BusConnects programme.

Note that the C-routes, P29 and X-routes do not come to the actual shopping centre, rather to stops on the N4 which is linked to the centre via footbridge.

Planning impropriety
For two decades an actual "town centre" had been planned in a central location to serve the Lucan, Clondalkin and Palmerstown areas. But Liffey Valley was built to the northeastern extremity of the area it was originally planned to serve. This meant, as noted by Jerry Barnes, chairman of the Royal Town Planning Institute, that the residents of Lucan, Clondalkin and Palmerstown "have been left for 20 years without an appropriately centrally located town centre which is easily accessible to all. This has very serious long-term implications for thousands of people".

Thirty Dublin councillors were investigated by the Mahon Tribunal over allegations about accepting bribes relating to the rezoning of land in Quarryvale. Seán Ardagh was named in the tribunal's report as having received contributions from lobbyist Frank Dunlop and developer Owen O’Callaghan, and the report names other councillors as "hopelessly compromised" due to their associations with the project.

References

External links
 Liffey Valley Shopping Centre
 The Retail Park, Liffey Valley

Reviews
 TripAdvisor reviews

Shopping centres in County Dublin
Clondalkin
Buildings and structures in South Dublin (county)
Shopping malls established in 1998